Gershenzon is a Yiddish surname. Notable people with the surname include:

Jonathan Gershenzon (born 1955), American biochemist
Mikhail Gershenzon (1869–1925),  Russian scholar, essayist, and editor

See also
Hershenson

Yiddish-language surnames